Rekha Ratheesh is an Indian television actress who has worked in Malayalam productions. She is better known for playing the role of Padippura Veettil Padmavathy in Parasparam , Madathilamma in Ayirathil Oruval and Mallika Prathap in  Manjil Virinja Poovu, establishing herself as the most bankable actress in the Malayalam television industry.

Personal life
Rekha was born to Ratheesh, who was a dubbing artiste and Radhadevi, who was an actress and dubbing artiste in 1982. Her father hailed from Thiruvananthapuram. She grew up in Chennai. Her parents got separated when she was 10 years old and she chose to stay with her father.

In April 2000, she got married and in December 2000, they got separated. She has married and separated three more times after this. Currently she is staying in Thiruvananthapuram with her son Ayan (born in 2011).

Career
Rekha made her debut at the age of four, playing the childhood of Revathi in Unnai Naan Santhithen. At the age of fourteen, Captain Raju introduced her into Malayalam television and made her debut in the serial, Nirakoottu on Asianet directed by Srivalsan. After a hiatus, she acted in A.M.Nazeer's Manasu then Devi, Kavyanjali and Swantham. After playing several supporting roles she got a break through Aayirathil Oruval telecasted in Mazhavil Manorama. In 2013, she played the lead role in opera Parasparam, which ranked as the Malayalam's longest ran soap opera. This character rose her fame and won her five Asianet Television awards consecutively from 2013 to 2018.

Television works

Filmography
 Unnai Naan Santhithen (1984) as Young Indumathi
 Pallavur Devanarayanan (1999) as Vasundhara's sister
 Mampazhakkalam (2004) as Sethu's wife
 Oru Nunakkadha (2011) as Savithri
 Subharathri (2019) as Sreeja's mother
 Ammakkorumma (2020) – album as Mother

References

External links 
 

Actresses in Malayalam television
Actresses in Tamil television
Actresses in Malayalam cinema
Year of birth missing (living people)
Living people
21st-century Indian actresses